Freudenburg is a municipality in the Trier-Saarburg district, in Rhineland-Palatinate, Germany. Freudenburg is twinned with the village of Appoigny in France.

Geographical location
The village lies at the foot of the Eiderberg, a 439 meter high elevation. South of the main town lies the border to the adjacent state of Saarland. Saarburg, the administrative seat of the municipality, is located about seven kilometres north-northeast. The area has a large number of hiking trails and old castle ruins. The village consists of an old town on the higher incline with many structures dating back to early 19th century and a newer conurbation of houses built from around 2005 on the other side of the town, heading towards the valley of Kollesleuken. The oldest structure, the old castle fort, dates back to the early 14th century.

History
In 1337 King John of Bohemia, Count of Luxembourg, built "Freudenburg" at the foot of the Eiderberg, at that time called "Freyding". As part of a castle protectorate between Trier and Luxembourg, it served to secure the Heerstraße Trier-Metz. As early as 1346 Freudenburg was referred to as a "city" in the context of a collective privilege of the Archdiocese. As a small farming town, Freudenburg took over central functions for the surrounding villages. With the purchase of the castle county "Freyding" by the imperial abbey of St. Maximin, the castle was rebuilt. In the dispute between the abbey and Elector Philipp Christoph von Sötern the castle was occupied in 1646 by Trier Archdiocese troops, destroyed and was not rebuilt. The community of Hospitals were assigned the ruins as part of a secularization exercise, which they later sold in 1861 to the local authority. The local authority then carried out restructuring and stabilization of the site in 1908 and again in 1980.

On July 18, 1946 Freudenburg was affiliated with another 80 municipalities across Trier and Saarburg Counties that, earlier, in February 1946 had been separated from the rest of the French occupation zone Saar territory, which was by then no longer under the Allied Control Council . On June 6, 1947, this territorial spin-off was reduced to 21 municipalities. In 1946 Freudenburg joined the newly formed state Rheinland-Pfalz (Rhineland-Palatinate.)

On June 7, 1969, a part of the local authority of Kirf with 101 inhabitants was re-joined to Freudenburg.

Population growth
The development of the population of Freudenburg based on the current municipality, the values from 1871 to 1987 based on censuses:

Local council 
The local council in Freudenburg consists of 16 council members, who were elected in the local election on 25 May 2014 in a personalized proportional representation election, and the honorary mayor as chairman.

The distribution of seats in the local council:

 UWF = Unabhängige Wählergruppe Freudenburg e.V (Freudenburg independent voter group.)

Local sightseeing 

 The ruins of the old castle from the 14th century. 
 A local private house contains a Jewish Mikve a remnant from the old Jewish community of the town
 Above the town centre (signposted) there is a Jewish cemetery first documented in 1694.
 In the nearby district of Kollesleuken on the river Leukbach there is an old mill "Herrenmühle", a successor of the Maximiner Mühle, that was destroyed in 1944. The mill is privately owned and since the end of the seventies was no longer in production.
 The nature reserve Eiderberg with many species of orchid
 Rock formations in the Leuktal (Kollesleuker's Switzerland) above the Herrenmühle

Public and sports facilities 
Freudenburg has a primary school, a football club as well as a kindergarten and children's playgrounds. For leisure activities there are two tennis courts, a gym and a sports field and for evening activities, Freudenburg boasts 2 pubs, the 'Kleine Kneipe' (the little pub) and a well known local bar and music venue the Ducsaal (Duke's Hall)

Economy 
Construction companies and small businesses (auto-garages, bakery, bistro, hairdressers, large furniture store) as well as service companies characterize the local working life.

References

External links 

 Freudenburg local authority website
 a portrait of Freudenburg  by SWR Fernsehen
 
 Castle ruins of Freudenburg around 1840 from Panorama of Trier and surroundings (~1840) via dilibri
 

Municipalities in Rhineland-Palatinate
Trier-Saarburg